Bail Act may refer to:

Bail Act 1898, act of the Parliament of the United Kingdom
Bail Act 1978, New South Wales law
Bail Act 2013, New South Wales law